Clement Mwape (born 28 February 1989) is a Zambian footballer who plays as a defender for ZESCO United F.C. and the Zambia national football team.

References

External links

1989 births
Living people
Nchanga Rangers F.C. players
City of Lusaka F.C. players
ZESCO United F.C. players
Zambian footballers
Zambia international footballers
Association football defenders
Zambia A' international footballers
2020 African Nations Championship players